Phoebis sennae, the cloudless sulphur, is a mid-sized butterfly in the family Pieridae found in the Americas. There are several similar species such as the yellow angled-sulphur (Anteos maerula), which has angled wings, statira sulphur (Aphrissa statira), and other sulphurs, which are much smaller.

Distribution
Their range is wide, from South America to southern Canada, in particular southwestern Ontario.  They are most common from Argentina to southern Texas, Georgia, and Florida, but are often visitors outside this range becoming more rare further north.

Habitat
The common habitats of this butterfly are open spaces, gardens, glades, seashores, and watercourses.

Diet
The adult butterfly feeds on nectar from many different flowers with long tubes including cordia, bougainvillea, cardinal flower, hibiscus, lantana, and wild morning glory. The larvae also feed on sennas and partridge peas.

Senna hebecarpa (American senna) is a larval host and nectar source for the cloudless sulphur butterfly in the Eastern United States.

Life cycle
The breeding season is dependent on the climate of the area, from midsummer to fall in the cooler areas, to year-round where the climate is warmer.

Egg
The cloudless sulphur starts off as a pitcher-shaped white egg.  Eventually it will turn to a pale orange.  The egg stage lasts six days.

Caterpillar

Once the egg hatches, a caterpillar emerges that is yellow to greenish, striped on sides, with black dots in rows across the back. The host plant may be partridge pea (Chamaecrista cinerea), sennas (Senna), clovers (Trifolium), or other legumes (Fabaceae).

Chrysalis
The caterpillar will form a chrysalis that is pointed at both ends and humped in the middle. The chrysalis will be either yellow or green with pink or green stripes. From the chrysalis comes a medium-sized butterfly with fairly elongated but not angled wings.

Adult
The male butterfly is clear yellow above and yellow or mottled with reddish brown below and the female is lemon yellow to golden or white on both surfaces, with varying amounts of black spotting along the margin and a black open square or star on the bottom forewing. Wingspan: .

Subspecies
Listed alphabetically:
P. s. amphitrite (Feisthamel, 1839) – Chile 
P. s. sennae or P. s. eubule – Jamaica, South Carolina, Kansas, Virginia, Florida, Cuba
P. s. marcellina (Cramer, [1779]) – Mexico, Uruguay, Galapagos, Suriname, Honduras, Brazil, Argentina, Bolivia, Peru

References

External links

Cloudless Sulphur, Butterflies of North Carolina Online
Video of Phoebis Sennae pupating and emerging, on YouTube
Cloudless Sulphur, Butterflies and Moths of North America
 Phoebis sennae  on the UF / IFAS Featured Creatures Web site

Coliadinae
Butterflies of North America
Butterflies of Central America
Butterflies of the Caribbean
Pieridae of South America
Insects of the Dominican Republic
Butterflies of Cuba
Butterflies of Jamaica
Lepidoptera of Brazil
Fauna of the Amazon
Butterflies described in 1758
Taxa named by Carl Linnaeus